Mohan Kanda (born 4 September 1945) is an Indian civil servant. He is an Indian Administrative Service officer of the 1968 batch. He retired as Chief Secretary of Andhra Pradesh in 2005. He is working as a member of National Disaster Management Authority.

Early life
He was born in Chennai Tamil Nadu, India in a Telugu Brahmin family to the High Court judge Mr. Bheema Shankaram Kanda and Mrs. Papayamma, a prominent social reformer. He did his schooling from All Saints High School, Hyderabad and his Bachelors and Masters in Mathematics from Nizam College, Osmania University. He was awarded Ph.D in Mathematics by Osmania University for his thesis. His nephew is Communist Party of India (Marxist) politburo member, Sitaram Yechury.

He has acted in a few Telugu films as a child actor with the screen name "Master Mohan." They include Pelli Chesi Choodu a comedy film of 1952 directed by L. V. Prasad. He acted in the song drama Amma Noppule Ammamma Noppule.

Career
Mohan Kanda started his career with State Bank of India as an Officer. After becoming an IAS officer he began working with the Government of Andhra Pradesh. He was also Secretary, Ministry of Agriculture, Government of India and served as Vice Chairman, National Disaster Management Agency (NDMA). He worked as a Secretary in the Union Ministry of Agriculture before working as Chief Secretary in Chandrababu Naidu's government and later with Y.S.Rajasekhara Reddy government.

He is a member of the steering committee on Agriculture and Allied Sectors for the formulation of the 12th Five Year Plan (2012–17) for Planning commission.

He was made head of a committee that would look into the problems faced by the Coastal Andhra riots in declaring a crop holiday.

Personal life
Mohan Kanda is married to Usha. She  assumed charge as Director General, MANAGE (National Centre for Management of Agricultural Extension) with effect from 1st August 2015.

References

External links
 Official Profile
 A Report on Land Resource Management By Mohan Kanda

Indian Administrative Service officers
1945 births
Male actors from Hyderabad, India
Living people
Indian male child actors
Chief Secretaries of Andhra Pradesh
Alumni of All Saints High School, Hyderabad